Class 91 may refer to:
British Rail Class 91
DRG or DR Class 91 2-6-0T tank locomotives with the Deutsche Reichsbahn:
 Class 91.0-1: Prussian T 9.2, BLE Nos. 36 to 43, PKP Class TKi2

Class 91.3-18: Prussian T 9.3
Class 91.19: Mecklenburg T 4
Class 91.20: Württemberg T 9

 KTM Class 91
South African Class 91-000